Emilio Aragón Álvarez (born 16 April 1959) is a Spanish director, musician, actor, presenter and producer.  He was the original presenter of the Spanish game show VIP Noche, which was a popular 1990s game show on the Spanish Telecinco network. He later hosted and directed the first season of El gran juego de la oca on Antena 3, also in Spain.  Since 2006 he has been the president of the television network La Sexta.

Life
Emilio Aragón Álvarez  was born 16 April 1959  in Havana, Cuba.  His father, Emilio Aragón Bermúdez or Miliki, was a clown, along with his grandfather Emilio Aragón Foureaux, known as Emig.  He began his career in the program The Great Circus of TVE in 1977, using stage name Milikito, with his father, his uncle Gabriel Aragón (Gaby), and his cousin Alfonso Aragón (Fofito) who were better known as Los Payasos de la Tele. He also went in to get his undergraduate degree in History from Suffolk University in Boston, Ma.

Filmography
 A Night in Old Mexico  (director, music composer and producer) (2013)
 Pájaros de papel  (director, writer, music composer and producer) (2010)
 Carlitos y el Campo de los Sueños  (music composer and producer) (2008)

Sources

Aragon Alvarez
Aragon Alvarez
Spanish male film actors
People from Havana
Spanish male actors
Spanish film directors
Spanish film producers
Spanish film score composers
Male film score composers
Spanish television presenters
Spanish male screenwriters
Spanish male writers
Spanish male musicians